So Hyun-kyung (born 1965) is a South Korean television screenwriter. She is best known for writing the TV dramas Brilliant Legacy (2009), Prosecutor Princess (2010), 49 Days (2011), My Daughter Seo-young (2012), and Two Weeks (2013).

Filmography
Golden Hour (TBA, 2020)
My Golden Life (KBS2, 2017)
Second 20s (tvN, 2015)
Two Weeks (MBC, 2013)
My Daughter Seo-young (KBS2, 2012-2013)
49 Days (SBS, 2011)
Prosecutor Princess (SBS, 2010)
Brilliant Legacy (SBS, 2009)
MBC Best Theater "The Taste of Others" (MBC, 2006)
How Much Love? (MBC, 2006)
She (SBS, 2005-2006)    
MBC Best Theater "Crying in the Glow of Sunset" (MBC, 2005)
A Saint and a Witch (MBC, 2003-2004)
Everyday with You (MBC, 2001-2002)

Awards
2013 APAN Star Awards: Best Writer (My Daughter Seo-young, Two Weeks)

References

External links
 
 

Living people
1965 births
South Korean screenwriters
South Korean television writers